Tomás Vázquez Vigil (born 30 August 1944) is a Mexican politician affiliated with the Institutional Revolutionary Party. As of 2014 he served as Senator of the LVIII and LIX Legislatures of the Mexican Congress representing Jalisco.

References

1944 births
Living people
People from Guadalajara, Jalisco
Members of the Senate of the Republic (Mexico)
Institutional Revolutionary Party politicians
21st-century Mexican politicians